The Paliser Case is a 1920 American silent mystery drama film produced and distributed by Goldwyn Pictures. Directed by William Parke, the film stars Pauline Frederick, Albert Roscoe, and James Neil. The film is now considered lost.

Plot
As described in a film magazine, Cassy Cara (Frederick), daughter of a Portuguese violinist whose talent has been obscured by a stroke following a holdup, attracts the attention of Monty Paliser (Gamble), a man of wealth who, failing to win her by any other means, marries her. Three days after the wedding she learns that the ceremony was not genuine and returns home, telling her father her story. That night Paliser is murdered while in his box at the opera. A young man who Cassy has loved, who was seated in the next box, is accused of the murder and a chain of evidence is built up around him. To shield him, Cassy confesses to the crime. Then her father tells the truth that he is guilty. The film ends with the death of the father and the reuniting of Cassy and her young man.

Cast
 Pauline Frederick as Cassy Cara
 Albert Roscoe as Lennox  (credited as Albert Roscoe)
 James Neil as Cara 
 Hazel Brennon as Margaret Austen (credited as Hazel Brennan)
 Kate Lester as Mrs. Austen
 Carrie Clark Ward as Tambourina
 Warburton Gamble as Monty Paliser
 Alec Francis as Paliser Sr. 
 Eddie Sutherland as Jack Menzies 
 Tom Ricketts as Major Archie Phipps
 Virginia Foltz as Mrs. Colquhuon

See also
List of lost films

References

External links

Pauline Frederick - The Paliser Case (1920) - stanford.edu page with 6 stills
Saltus, Edgar (1919), The Paliser Case, New York: Boni and Liveright, on the Internet Archive

1920 films
1920s mystery drama films
American mystery drama films
American silent feature films
American black-and-white films
Goldwyn Pictures films
Lost American films
Films directed by William Parke
1920 lost films
Lost drama films
1920 drama films
1920s American films
Silent American drama films
Silent mystery drama films